Abdollahabad (also Romanized as ‘Abdollāhābād) is a village in Harazpey-ye Shomali Rural District, Sorkhrud District, Mahmudabad County, Mazandaran Province, Iran. At the 2006 census, its population was 1,365, in 373 families.

References 

Populated places in Mahmudabad County